Matthias H. Nichols (October 3, 1824 – September 15, 1862) was a U.S. Representative from Ohio.

Born in Sharptown, New Jersey, Nichols attended the common schools. He later learned the trade of a printer then moved to Ohio in 1842 and settled in Lima, where he studied law. He was admitted to the bar in 1849 and commenced practice in Lima, Ohio.

Nichols was elected prosecuting attorney for Allen County in 1851, but resigned the following year to campaign for Congress.

Nichols was elected as a Democrat to the Thirty-third Congress, elected as an Opposition Party candidate to the Thirty-fourth Congress, and reelected as a Republican to the Thirty-fifth Congress (March 4, 1853 – March 3, 1859).
He was an unsuccessful candidate for reelection in 1858 to the Thirty-sixth Congress.
He resumed the practice of his profession.
He died in Cincinnati, Ohio, September 15, 1862.
He was interred in the Old Cemetery, Lima, Ohio.
He was reinterred in Woodlawn Cemetery.

Sources

External links 
 

1824 births
1862 deaths
People from Salem County, New Jersey
Democratic Party members of the United States House of Representatives from Ohio
Opposition Party members of the United States House of Representatives from Ohio
Republican Party members of the United States House of Representatives from Ohio
Politicians from Lima, Ohio
County district attorneys in Ohio
19th-century American politicians